Matthew Powell may refer to:

 Matt Powell (born 1978), Welsh rugby union footballer
 Matthew Powell (Australian footballer) (born 1973), former Australian rules footballer
 Matthew Powell (soccer) (born 1996), American soccer player